Tehran's universities in alphabetic order are:

See also

Higher education in Iran
List of universities in Iran 

Tehran Province, List of universities in
Education in Tehran Province